The seventh edition of Dancing Stars was broadcast from 9 March to 18 May 2012 on ORF1 and was presented by Mirjam Weichselbraun and Klaus Eberhartinger.

Couples

Scoring chart

Red numbers indicate the lowest score for each week.
Green numbers indicate the highest score for each week.
 indicates the couple eliminated that week.
 indicates the returning couple that finished in the bottom two.
 indicates the returning couple that was the last to be called safe.
 indicates the winning couple.
 indicates the runner-up couple.
 indicates the third-place couple.

Highest and lowest scoring performances of the series 
The best and worst performances in each dance according to the judges' marks are as follows:

Average chart

Average Dance chart

Dance order

Week 1: "Aus für Katerina Jacob" 

Individual judges scores in charts below (given in parentheses) are listed in this order from left to right: Thomas Schäfer-Elmayer, Balazs Ekker, Nicole Burns-Hansen and Hannes Nedbal.

Running order

Week 2: "Aus für Albert Fortell" 

Individual judges scores in charts below (given in parentheses) are listed in this order from left to right: Thomas Schäfer-Elmayer, Balazs Ekker, Nicole Burns-Hansen and Hannes Nedbal.

Running order

Week 3: "Aus für Michael Schönborn" 

Individual judges scores in charts below (given in parentheses) are listed in this order from left to right: Thomas Schäfer-Elmayer, Balazs Ekker, Nicole Burns-Hansen and Hannes Nedbal.

Running order

Week 4: "Aus für David Heissig" 

Individual judges scores in charts below (given in parentheses) are listed in this order from left to right: Thomas Schäfer-Elmayer, Balazs Ekker, Nicole Burns-Hansen and Hannes Nedbal.

Running order

Week 5: "Aus für Sueli Menezes" 

Individual judges scores in charts below (given in parentheses) are listed in this order from left to right: Thomas Schäfer-Elmayer, Balazs Ekker, Nicole Burns-Hansen and Hannes Nedbal.

Running order

Week 6: "Aus für Wolfram Pirchner" 

Individual judges scores in charts below (given in parentheses) are listed in this order from left to right: Thomas Schäfer-Elmayer, Balazs Ekker, Nicole Burns-Hansen and Hannes Nedbal.

Running order

Week 7: "Aus für Dolly Buster" 

Individual judges scores in charts below (given in parentheses) are listed in this order from left to right: Thomas Schäfer-Elmayer, Balazs Ekker, Nicole Burns-Hansen and Hannes Nedbal.

Running order

Week 8: "Aus für Eva Maria Marold" 

Individual judges scores in charts below (given in parentheses) are listed in this order from left to right: Thomas Schäfer-Elmayer, Balazs Ekker, Nicole Burns-Hansen and Hannes Nedbal.

Running order

Week 9: "Aus für Brigitte Kren" 

Individual judges scores in charts below (given in parentheses) are listed in this order from left to right: Thomas Schäfer-Elmayer, Balazs Ekker, Nicole Burns-Hansen and Hannes Nedbal.

Running order

Week 10: "Das Finale" 

Individual judges scores in charts below (given in parentheses) are listed in this order from left to right: Thomas Schäfer-Elmayer, Balazs Ekker, Nicole Burns-Hansen and Hannes Nedbal.

Running order

Call-out order
The table below lists the order in which the contestants' fates were revealed. The order of the safe couples doesn't reflect the viewer voting results.

 This couple came in first place with the judges.
 This couple came in last place with the judges.
 This couple came in last place with the judges and was eliminated.
 This couple was eliminated.
 This couple won the competition.
 This couple came in second in the competition.

Dance chart

 Highest scoring dance
 Lowest scoring dance

References
Official website of Dancing Stars

Season 07
2012 Austrian television seasons